Fear of Life may refer to:

Fear of Life, book by Alexander Lowen 1980
Fear of Life, album by Channel 3 (band) 1982
Fear of Life, album by Creative Adult 2016
"Fear of Life", song by Murray Head from Wave (Murray Head album)